Mishcon de Reya LLP is a British law firm with offices in London and Singapore. Founded in 1937, it employs more than 1200 people with over 600 lawyers. It is regarded as forming part of the "Silver Circle" of leading UK law firms.

In March 2017, the firm was announced Law Firm of the Year at the Legal Business Awards. Mishcon de Reya records revenue of £230.7 million for the last financial year, 2021-2022 – an increase of 22% from the previous financial year, which saw profit per equity partner (PEP) at the London firm jump by 11% to just over £1m.

History
Mishcon de Reya was formed by the merger of Victor Mishcon & Co, a one-man office founded by Victor Mishcon, and Bartletts de Reya.

In 2008, the firm launched the specialist 'Pink Law' Legal Advice Centre in conjunction with Queen Mary, University of London, and two other city law firms. The project offers free and impartial legal advice on issues affecting the Lesbian, Gay, Bisexual and Transgender (LGBT) community, such as employment discrimination, civil partnerships and cohabitation. In 2016, this expanded to include SPITE, for victims of 'revenge porn', and again in 2020 with the Black Justice Project, which assists members of the Black community.

The firm became a limited liability partnership on 9 October 2015.

In 2016, Mishcon de Reya and children's charity Place2Be produced a book written for adults by children on the topic of parental separation 'Splitting Up: A Child's Guide to a Grown Up Problem'.

Mishcon de Reya was named Law Firm of the Year at The Legal Business Awards 2017.

Mishcon de Reya represented the Project for the Registration of Children as British Citizens (PRCBC) in a landmark case in 2019, in which the High Court in London ruled that the £1,012 fee the Home Office charges children to register as a British citizen was unlawful. 

In May 2020 the firm opened a new branch office in Singapore, focused on delivering legal services to high net worth families across South East Asia.

In 2021, the firm announced MDR Solutions I, a venture with Harbour to fund litigation and arbitration cases. It also shared news of a strategic combination agreement with Taylor Vinters, a legal and advisory business, to offer legal and consultancy services to innovators and entrepreneurs. In November that year, it launched an association with Karas LLP in Hong Kong, following its approval to open a branch office in association with the Hong Kong-registered firm earlier that year.

The company runs a VIP Russia service that provides “reputation protection,” wealth structuring and asset protection for Russian clients. The Pandora Papers revealed that the company helped Russian politician Alexei Chepa use an offshore company to buy a London mansion. 

In January 2023 Mishcon de Reya LLP merged with Taylor Vinters bringing over 200 people from Taylor Vinters: 145 fee-earners and 60 business operations and legal operations staff.

Notable clients
In 1995 one of the firm's solicitors, Anthony Julius, represented Diana, Princess of Wales, in her divorce.

In 2000 the firm represented historian Deborah Lipstadt in the case David Irving v Penguin Books and Deborah Lipstadt. The 2016 film Denial was based on the case.

Mishcon de Reya's Employment team won a case in the UK Supreme Court on behalf of its client Krista Bates van Winkelhof, in which it was determined that members of limited liability partnerships (LLPs) do have the protection of whistleblowing legislation.

In 2016 the Supreme Court ruled financial claims can be brought over 20 years after divorce for client Kathleen Wyatt.

In 2016 the company co-ordinated a challenge in the High Court by Gina Miller, an investment manager and philanthropist, against the process of the United Kingdom's withdrawal from the European Union. The Government in January 2017 appealed the High Court ruling to the Supreme Court, but were unsuccessful. In a majority decision, it ruled that Parliament must vote on whether the Government could start the process of the United Kingdom's withdrawal from the European Union.

The firm again represented Gina Miller in 2019 in R (on behalf of Miller) v The Prime Minister. The Supreme Court unanimously ruled that Prime Minister Boris Johnson's decision to prorogue Parliament was unlawful.

In 2019 the Court of Appeal overturned the Judgment of Mr Justice Warby dated 8 October 2018 which had refused Mishcon de Reya's client, Richard Lloyd, permission to serve a representative action on Google LLC. The claim relates to what is known as the "Safari Workaround" - Google's alleged unlawful and clandestine tracking of iPhone users in 2011 and 2012 without their consent through the use of third party cookies.

In 2020, the firm acted on behalf of 397 Hiscox Action Group members, in a £52 million claim against Hiscox Insurance for refusing to pay out on business interruption claims due to COVID-19. The Supreme Court handed down its judgment in favour of the policyholders.

Notable people

Victor Mishcon, Baron Mishcon, QC, DL, founder

Anthony Julius, Deputy Chairman

Criticism

In January 2022, the firm agreed to pay a record fine of £232,500 plus costs, following an investigation by the Solicitors Regulation Authority (SRA), for committing what the SRA called "serious breaches" of money laundering rules.

In 2020 the Solicitors Regulation Authority (SRA) announced that their forensic and anti-money laundering investigators were conducting a multi year investigation into the company's activities.

In connection  with the murdered Maltese journalist Daphne Caruana Galizia, The Guardian newspaper reported:

According to the British satirical magazine Private Eye:

See also
News media phone hacking scandal reference list

References

External links

1937 establishments in the United Kingdom
Law firms established in 1937
Law firms of the United Kingdom